Glyptobaris lecontei is a species of flower weevil in the family of beetles known as Curculionidae. It is found in North America.

References

Further reading

External links

 

Baridinae
Articles created by Qbugbot
Beetles described in 1909